Johan Karlsson (born 20 June 2001) is a Swedish football defender who plays for IK Sirius.

References

2001 births
Living people
Swedish footballers
Association football defenders
IK Sirius Fotboll players
Allsvenskan players